Kim Hyun-Soo (born March 13, 1973) is a South Korean former footballer who played as a center back. He is currently the First Team coach of Daegu FC.

Kim started club career with Pusan Daewoo Royals and was part of the South Korea national football team. He played at 1998 FIFA World Cup qualification.

Club career statistics

Honour 
K-League Best XI : 2000, 2001, 2002, 2003

External links
 National Team player record 
 
 

1973 births
Living people
Association football defenders
South Korean footballers
South Korea international footballers
Busan IPark players
Seongnam FC players
Incheon United FC players
Jeonnam Dragons players
Daegu FC players
K League 1 players
Ajou University alumni
Seoul E-Land FC managers
South Korean football managers